Bleach (stylized in all caps) is a Japanese manga series written and illustrated by Tite Kubo. It follows the adventures of a teenager Ichigo Kurosaki, who inherits his parents' destiny after he obtains the powers of a Soul Reaper—a death personification similar to the Grim Reaper—from another Soul Reaper, Rukia Kuchiki. His new-found powers allow him to take on the duties of defending humans from evil spirits and guiding departed souls to the afterlife, and set him on journeys to various ghostly realms of existence.

Bleach was serialized in Shueisha's shōnen manga magazine Weekly Shōnen Jump from August 2001 to August 2016, with its chapters collected in 74 tankōbon volumes. The series has spawned a media franchise that includes an anime television series adaptation that was produced by Tokyo-based studio Pierrot from 2004 to 2012, two original video animation (OVA) episodes, four animated feature films, ten stage musicals, and numerous video games, as well as many types of Bleach-related merchandise. A Japanese live-action film adaptation produced by Warner Bros. premiered in 2018.

In North America, the manga was licensed for English release by Viz Media in 2004. They have released the collected volumes and published its chapters in their Shonen Jump magazine from November 2007 until the magazine's final issue in April 2012.

Bleach received the 50th Shogakukan Manga Award for the shōnen category in 2005. The manga had over 130 million tankōbon volumes in circulation worldwide by 2022, making it the twelfth best-selling manga in history.

Plot summary

Ichigo Kurosaki is a teenager from Karakura Town who can see ghosts, a talent allowing him to meet a supernatural human Rukia Kuchiki, who enters the town in search of a Hollow, a kind of monstrous lost soul who can harm both ghosts and humans. When she is severely wounded defending Ichigo from a Hollow she pursues, Rukia transfers her powers to Ichigo, so he may fight in her stead while she recovers her strength. Rukia is thereby trapped in an ordinary human body, and must advise Ichigo as he balances the demands of his substitute Soul Reaper duties and attending high school. For aid in hunting the Hollows, the pair ally with a trio of other spiritually empowered allies: Ichigo's high school classmate Orihime Inoue, best friend Yasutora "Chad" Sado and Uryū Ishida, a Quincy classmate with the ability to control spiritual particles.

Eventually, Rukia is arrested by her Soul Reaper superiors and sentenced to death for the illegal act of transferring her powers into a human. Ichigo and his friends enlist the help of ex-Soul Reaper scientist Kisuke Urahara, who trains Ichigo to access his own Soul Reaper powers, to enter the Soul Society and rescue Rukia. Shortly after the party's arrival in the Soul Society, conflict arises among the captains of the Thirteen Court Squads when the captain of the fifth company, Sōsuke Aizen, is apparently murdered; the captains believed that the intruders might have been responsible, which causes the Soul Reapers to begin fighting amongst themselves. Thereafter, the Captain Commander Genryusai Shigekuni Yamamoto, issues the Soul Reapers to arrest Ichigo and his friends as suspects. However, Ichigo saves Rukia and manages to stop the war against the Soul Society. Aizen accompanies his fellow conspirators, Gin Ichimaru and Kaname Tōsen, who are the third and ninth company's captains, as they use Hollows to cover their escape into the Hollows' realm, . Afterwards, Ichigo and Rukia reconcile with the Soul Reapers, who view the former as a powerful ally and designate him an official title as Substitute Soul Reaper.

Ichigo soon finds himself and his friends in escalating skirmishes with Aizen's army of humanoid Hollows, the Arrancar, as they are joined by the Vizards. Soul Reapers who were victims of Aizen's experiments in creating Soul Reaper/Hollow hybrids. When Ulquiora, one of the Espada (Aizen's ten most powerful Arrancars) kidnaps Orihime, Ichigo and his allies enter Hueco Mundo to invade Las Noches. However, as Ichigo rescues Orihime, Aizen reveals her abduction was a distraction as he launches an attack on Karakura Town, in order to sacrifice everyone and create a key to the Soul King's Palace, so he can kill the Soul King who reigns over the Soul Society. Anticipating Aizen's attack, the Thirteen Court Squads had already been waiting for him by moving the entire Karakura Town to the Soul Society prior to his attack. When the Vizards join the remaining Soul Reapers, Gin reveals his agenda of killing Aizen. The latter uses the Hōgyoku to become a Hollow-like being. However, Ichigo sacrifices his power to defeat Aizen and reverts to a normal human.

Months later, preparing for life after high school, Ichigo is called back into action when Xcution, a gang of Fullbringers—supernaturally aware humans like Chad—manipulate him and his loved ones in a scheme to siphon his Fullbring abilities. After his Soul Society allies restore his Soul Reaper powers, Ichigo learns that Xcution's leader, Kugo Ginjo, was his predecessor. It is revealed that the Soul Society did not trust the substitute Soul Reapers, so they used the badge given to the Substitute Soul Reaper to monitor and restrict his power output. Ginjo felt betrayed and swore vengeance to all Soul Reapers. Despite knowing the truth, Ichigo decides to trust his Soul Reaper friends and defeats Ginjo. With his power restored, Ichigo once again is reinstated as a Substitute Soul Reaper.

After Ichigo regained his powers, an army of Quincies known as the  appear and declare war against the Soul Society, having already enslaved many Arrancars in Hueco Mundo. The group is led by Yhwach, the ancient progenitor of the Quincies, who seeks to kill the Soul King and rid the world of death and fear. In their first invasion, the Wandenreich kill many Soul Reapers including the Head-Captain, Yamamoto. Uryū joins Yhwach and learns the truth behind the death of his mother. Later on, Ichigo and his friends aid the Soul Society in fighting the Wandenreich's second invasion, but Yhwach succeeds in invading the Royal Palace and killing the Soul King. In the final battle, the surviving Shinigami, along with Ichigo and his friends, assault Yhwach's new palace and defeat his most powerful Sternritter. Yhwach returns to the Soul Society to destroy it, but Ichigo defeats him with the help of Uryū and Aizen, after the latter was temporarily released from prison.

Ten years later, Rukia becomes the new captain of the thirteenth company and has a daughter, an apprentice Soul Reaper named Ichika, with her childhood friend Renji Abarai. Meanwhile, Ichigo and Orihime have a son named Kazui, who is also a Soul Reaper. Two years later, Ichigo attends the Soul Funeral Ceremony for Jūshirō Ukitake. While the Captains are waiting in the Soul Society to perform the ritual, Ichigo joins the Lieutenants at Karakura Town to capture Hollows that will be used as a sacrifice. They are ambushed by the Beasts of Hell, led by the late Octava Espada. Even though the lieutenants managed to easily suppress them, it is revealed that the ceremony is a process of sending the late captains to Hell.

Production
Bleach was first conceived from Tite Kubo's desire to draw a Shinigami (Soul Reaper) in a kimono, which formed the basis for the design of the Soul Reapers in the series. At first, Kubo thought that the Soul Reapers should use guns, so the first title for the series was "Snipe" (as in "sniper"); however, this was changed with the inclusion of swords. After that, the series was meant to be named "Black" due to the color of the Soul Reapers' clothes, but Kubo thought the title was too generic. He later tried the name of "White", but came to like "Bleach" more for its association with the color white and that he did not find it too obvious. The original story concept was submitted to Weekly Shōnen Jump shortly after the cancellation of Kubo's previous manga, Zombiepowder, but was at first rejected. Manga artist Akira Toriyama saw the story and wrote a letter of encouragement to Kubo. Bleach was accepted for publication a short time later in 2001, and was initially intended to be a shorter series, with a maximum serialization length of five years. Early plans for the story did not include the hierarchical structure of the Soul Society, but did include some characters and elements that were not introduced into the plot until the Arrancar arc, such as Ichigo's Soul Reaper parentage.

Kubo has cited influences for elements of Bleach ranging from other manga series to music, foreign language, architecture, and film. He attributed his interest in drawing the supernatural and monsters to Shigeru Mizuki's GeGeGe no Kitaro and Bleachs focus on interesting weaponry and battle scenes to Masami Kurumada's Saint Seiya, manga that Kubo enjoyed as a boy. The latter is based on Greek mythology and Kubo also considered it as a source for his focus on myths, monsters and the afterlife. The action style and storytelling found in Bleach are inspired by cinema, though Kubo has not revealed any specific movie as being an influence for fight scenes. When pressed, he told interviewers that he liked Snatch but did not use it as a model. Bleachs fight choreography is instead constructed with the aid of rock music, which the author listens to while imagining the fights in order to give him a sense of pacing for the panel cuts and change of angles through the scenes. Kubo prefers to draw realistic injuries in order to render the fight more impactful, by making the readers feel the pain the characters are feeling. Bleach fight scenes are often broken up with brief gags, which the author inserts when he grows bored during the illustration process.

Bleachs plotting process is focused around character design. When writing plotlines or having difficulties generating new material, Kubo begins by thinking of new characters, often en masse, and rereading previous volumes of Bleach. Kubo has said that he likes creating characters that have outward appearances that do not match their true nature—an element that can be found in many Bleach characters—as he is "attracted to people with that seeming contradiction" and finds an "urge to draw people like that" when he works. The terminology used in Bleach has a variety of inspirations, with each category of characters bearing a different linguistic theme. Many of the names for swords and spells used by Soul Reapers were inspired by ancient Japanese literature. Hollows and Arrancars use Spanish terms. Fullbringers use English vocabulary, with names referencing rock music, and finally, both Quincy and Bounts draw on the German language. This multilingual terminology, along with the variety in apparent character ethnicities, emphasizes the international nature of the Bleach settings.

Themes and analysis
Bleachs plot incorporates the traditional Japanese belief of spirits coexisting with humans and their nature, good or evil, depends on the circumstances. An example is Orihime's backstory. She was raised from the age of three by her brother Sora, and prayed for his soul's peace after he died in a car accident. As time went on, she prayed less and Sora became jealous and turned into a Hollow and attacked Orihime. Academic Patrick Drazen says this is a reminder to the audience to not abandon the old ways or risk the spirits taking offense and causing problems in the world. Bleach also incorporates Shinto themes of purification of "evil spirits through charms, scrolls, incantations, and other rituals". Christopher A. Born regards Bleach as transmitting Confucian values.

Von Feigenblatt describes Bleach as being culturally and religiously aware, as it draws upon Christianity and Caribbean Santería. Spanish terms are prevalent throughout the realm of Hueco Mundo, while both Quincy and Bounts have been known to associate with the German language, making Kubo's world of characters diverse in race and language as well. Von Feigenblatt notes that the Quincy "are clearly inspired by the Roman Catholic Christian Orders of Knighthood such as the Sovereign Military Order of Malta and the Equestrian Order of the Holy Sepulchre whose influence is shown in terms of the uniform worn by the Quincy as well as by the symbolism of the cross".

Publication

Bleach, written and illustrated by Tite Kubo, was serialized for fifteen years in Shueisha's Weekly Shōnen Jump from August 7, 2001, to August 22, 2016. Its 698 individual chapters were collected in seventy-four tankōbon volumes released between January 5, 2002, and November 4, 2016. Shueisha published the first twenty-one volumes compiled into six omnibus collections under the name Resurrected Souls to celebrate the tenth anniversary of the series. The first collection was released on August 22, 2011; the last collection was published on January 23, 2012. On September 21, 2012, Shueisha released 45 digital volumes in Japanese e-book stores, concluding with the 74th on November 4, 2016. These digital editions have been re-released as a set of 10 volumes on April 26, 2013; the sixth was released on March 14, 2014.

North American licensor Viz Media serialized the first chapters in the print magazine Shonen Jump from its November 2007 to April 2012 issues. The series moved to the digital anthology Weekly Shonen Jump Alpha in January 2012 and Viz Media released it digitally as Shueisha published new chapters in Japan. The first volume on English was released on July 6, 2004, and the last volume–the 74th–was released on October 2, 2018. Viz also released a hardcover "collector's edition" of the first volume that came with a dust jacket, two box sets, and twenty-five "3-in-1 edition" volumes between June 7, 2011, and March 5, 2019. Viz Media released first 16 volumes in English digitally on June 17, 2011. As of October 2, 2018, all 74 digital volumes were released.

A 73-page chapter was published in Weekly Shōnen Jump, to commemorate the 20th anniversary of the manga's debut in the magazine, on August 10, 2021. It was published in English by Viz Media's Shonen Jump online magazine and on the Shueisha's Manga Plus online platform. The chapter was digitally released as a collected volume on December 3, 2021.

Related media

Anime

Bleach was adapted by studio Pierrot into an anime television series directed by Noriyuki Abe and broadcast for 366 episodes on TV Tokyo, from October 2004 to March 2012.

In March 2020, it was announced that the manga's final story arc, "Thousand-Year Blood War", would receive a new anime project. In November 2021, it was announced that the new project would be an anime television series. It is directed by Tomohisa Taguchi and premiered in October 2022.

Films

The series has spawned four animated films: Bleach: Memories of Nobody, premiered on December 16, 2006; Bleach: The DiamondDust Rebellion, premiered on December 22, 2007; Bleach: Fade to Black, premiered on December 13, 2008; and Bleach: Hell Verse, premiered on December 4, 2010. A live-action film adaptation premiered in Japan on July 20, 2018.

Light novels
Tite Kubo and Makoto Matsubara have co-authored three novelizations of the Bleach series, which were published by Shueisha under its Shounen Jump Books label. The first volume, Bleach - Letters From The Other Side: The Death and The Strawberry, was published on December 15, 2004, and re-released as Bleach - Letters From The Other Side: The Death and The Strawberry - New Edition on November 4, 2009. The second, Bleach: The Honey Dish Rhapsody, was published on November 30, 2006. The third, Bleach: The Death Save The Strawberry, was published on September 4, 2012. Two novelizations of the Bleach series have been co-authored by Narita Ryohgo. The first volume, Bleach: Spirits Are Forever With You, and the second, Bleach: Spirits Are Forever With You 2, were published on June 4, 2012.

After the series ended in 2016, a series of novels were released by Shueisha. The first novel, Bleach: WE DO knot ALWAYS LOVE YOU, was written by the writer of Bleach: The Death Save The Strawberry Makoto Matsubara  and was published on December 27, 2016. The second, Bleach: Can't Fear Your Own World, is a serialized novel written by the writer of Bleach: Spirits Are Forever With You series Narita Ryohgo and was released bi-weekly from April 28, 2017. The first volume was released on August 4, 2017 and the second volume was published on November 2, 2018. The novel series ended with the release of the third volume on December 4, 2018. Viz Media published the three volumes of Bleach: Can't Fear Your Own World between July 7, 2020, and April 20, 2021.

Shueisha published four novelizations based on the Bleach movies. The first volume, Bleach: Memories of Nobody, was published on December 18, 2006. The second, Bleach: The DiamondDust Rebellion, Another Hyōrinmaru, was published on December 22, 2007. The third, Bleach: Fade to Black, I Call Your Name, was published on December 15, 2008. The fourth volume, Bleach: Hell Chapter, was published on December 6, 2010.

Video games

A number of video games have been created featuring characters from the Bleach series, primarily though not exclusively fighting games. The first video game to be released from the Bleach series was Bleach: Heat the Soul, which debuted on March 24, 2005, for the Sony PlayStation Portable. Currently, the majority of the games have only been released in Japan, though Sega has localized the first three Nintendo DS games and the first Wii game for North America. So far, all dedicated Bleach games released for Sony's consoles have been developed and published by SCEI, whereas the games for Nintendo consoles are developed and published by Sega, and the Nintendo DS games are developed by Treasure Co. Ltd. Two mobile games had also been released in 2014 (Bleach: Bankai Batoru) and 2015 (Bleach: Brave Souls) for the series, which are available for iOS and Android. In 2017, Line announced the release of a game exclusive for their communication app called Bleach: Paradise Lost.

Trading card game

Two collectible card games (CCG) based on the Bleach series have been produced, one in the Japanese market and a different one in North America. Bleach Soul Card Battle, produced by Bandai, was introduced in Japan in 2004. Twenty named sets were released for the series. After Bleach Soul Card Battle, Bandai introduced three more series. Bleach The Card Gum, which contains 14 sets, was released in early September 2007. The next series, Bleach Clear Collection, which contains six sets, was released in July 2008. The last series, Bleach Clear Soul Plate, which consists of three sets, was published in December 2009.

Bleach TCG was introduced in the United States by Score Entertainment in May 2007, but ceased publication April 2009, just before the planned launch of its seventh expansion, Bleach Infiltration. This cancellation was attributed to the ongoing recession, which has heavily affected TCG sales. Designed by Aik Tongtharadol, the TCG is a two-player game in which each player starts with at least 61 cards: a "Guardian" card, a 60-card "main deck", and an optional 20-card "side deck". A player loses if his or her power, as dictated by the Guardian card, is reduced to zero, or if he or she is unable to draw or discard a card from his or her deck. The cards for the game have been released in named sets with each set released in three formats: a 72-card pre-constructed box set containing a starter deck and two booster packs, a 10-card booster pack, and a 12-pack booster box. Six named sets were released.

Musicals

Bleach has been adapted into a series of rock musicals, jointly produced by Studio Pierrot and Nelke Planning. There have been five musicals produced which covered portions of the Substitute and Soul Society arcs, as well as five additional performances known as "Live Bankai Shows" and "Rock Musical Bleach Shinsei", which did not follow the Bleach plotline. The initial performance run of the Bleach musical was from August 17–28, 2005, at the Space Zero Tokyo center in Shinjuku.

The musicals are directed by Takuya Hiramitsu, with script adaptation by Naoshi Okumura and music composed by playwright Shoichi Tama. The songs are completely original and not taken from the anime soundtrack. Key actors in the series include Tatsuya Isaka, who plays Ichigo Kurosaki, Miki Satō, who plays Rukia Kuchiki, and Eiji Moriyama, who plays Renji Abarai.

In 2016, another musical was produced to celebrate Bleach 15th anniversary. The musical was directed and written by Tsutsumi Yasuyuki with Dream5's Akira Takano and Chihiro Kai as Ichigo Kurosaki and Rukia Kuchiki respectively. The musical debuted on July 28, 2016, in AiiA 2.5 Theater Tokyo.

Other media
The first Bleach artbook, All Colour But The Black, was released in Japan, the United States, and Europe. The artbook compiles a selection of color spreads from the first 19 volumes of the series, as well as some original art and author commentary. The second artbook, was released on August 3, 2007. In addition to character guides and articles on other fictional aspects of the series, it compiles the various short comics, that were published in V Jump. The omake-style panels are similar to those included in the main series, but reveal more of the daily lives of characters. Color Bleach+: Bleach Official Bootleg was released in English by Viz Media on August 10, 2010. In December 2018, another artbook, titled Bleach JET was released, which contains a massive 700 artworks from the series' 15 years tenure.

Seven databooks have also been released about the series. The first two, Bleach: Official Character Book SOULs. and Bleach: Official Animation Book VIBEs., were released on February 3, 2006. Bleach: Official Character Book SOULs. was later released in English by Viz Media on November 18, 2008. The third book, Bleach: Official Character Book 2: MASKED, was released on August 4, 2010. This book covers details about characters that appear 100 years prior to the story, such as former captains and lieutenants, along with the Arrancars and Visoreds. Although it was released on the same day as volume 46, Back From Blind, the book only covers material up to volume 37, Beauty Is So Solitary. The English version was released by Viz Media on March 6, 2012. A fourth book Bleach: Official Invitation Book The Hell Verse, was published on December 4, 2010. This book was released to promote Bleach: Hell Verse and it contains character sketches, promotional posters and the one-off Hell manga special. A fifth book Bleach: Official Character Book 3: UNMASKED, was released on June 3, 2011, the same day as the volume 50 of the series. However it only covers material up to volume 48, God is Dead. On June 4, 2012, a sixth book was released under the name Bleach: The Rebooted Souls. This free booklet was distributed with Bleach manga volume 55, with the aim to provide information to readers about the manga's final arc, The Thousand-Year Blood War. The seventh book, BLEACH 13 BLADEs., was released on August 4, 2015, and focused solely on the Soul Reapers and the 13 Court Squads.

Shueisha published a special book Bleach: JCCover Postcard Book MAILs., which was released on December 4, 2013. It features cover pages as postcards up to volume 60 with poems on the back.

Reception

Sales
Bleach had over 90million tankōbon copies in circulation worldwide by 2017; over 120 million tankōbon copies in circulation worldwide by 2018; and over 130 million copies in circulation worldwide by 2022, making it the seventh best-selling series of all time from Weekly Shōnen Jump. During 2008, volume 34 of the manga sold 874,153 copies in Japan, becoming the twelfth best-seller comics from the year. Volumes 33 and 35 have also ranked 17 and 18, respectively. In total the manga has sold 3,161,825 copies in Japan during 2008, becoming the year's fifth best selling series. In the first half from 2009, Bleach ranked as the second best-selling manga in Japan, having sold 3.5 million copies. Having sold 927,610 copies, volume 36 ranked seventh, volume 37 was eighth with 907,714 sold copies, and volume 38 at tenth with 822,238 copies.

North American sales of the manga have also been high, with tankōbon volumes having sold over 1.2million copies by 2007. Volume 16 placed in the top 10 graphic novel sales in December 2006 and volume 17 was the best-selling manga volume for the month of February 2007. In a 2010 interview, Gonzalo Ferreyra, Vice President of Sales and Marketing for Viz, listed Bleach as one of six Viz titles that continue to exceed expectations in spite of the harshening manga market. By 2022, the manga had over 2.7million tankōbon volumes in circulation in the United States.

Critical reception
Deb Aoki from About.com considered the series as the Best Continuing Shōnen Manga of 2007, along with Eyeshield 21, praising the "compelling stories, dazzling action sequences and great character development". She also placed the title on her list of "Top 10 Shōnen Manga Must-Reads". The artwork and the character designs received positive response by IGN's A.E. Sparrow. He also commented on the series' ability to handle multiple minor character plotlines at the same time, which he considered a point of appeal, in response to fans' claims about a "lack of a story" in Bleach. Leroy Douresseaux from Comic Book Bin agreed with Sparrow in the number of storylines, but also praised the fighting scenes finding them comparable to the ones of popular films. On the other hand, Mania reviewer Jarred Pine criticized the series as being plagued with stereotypes from the genre. He felt it was a rough start for the series with unimpressive battles, overused gags, and a bad introduction for central character Ichigo that causes him to come across "as a frowning punk" whose one good trait is his desire to protect. Despite this, Pine notes that he loves the series, particularly its quirky, lovable characters. Jason Thompson said he was no longer able to take Bleach seriously after it introduced villains Ulquiorra and Yammy in a scene precisely mirroring Vegeta and Nappa's arrival in Dragon Ball Z, but acknowledged it was likely intended as a deliberate homage. He also said Kubo was able to avoid the worst artistic failings typical in series which indulge in superpowered combat, but that the battle scenes were still sometimes difficult to follow.

Accolades
In 2005, Bleach was awarded the 50th Shogakukan Manga Award in the shōnen category. The English version of the manga was nominated for the "best manga" and "best theme" awards at the 2006 and 2007 American Anime Awards, but did not win either category.

In November 2014, readers of Media Factory's Da Vinci magazine voted Bleach the 16th Weekly Shōnen Jumps greatest manga series of all time. On TV Asahi's Manga Sōsenkyo 2021 poll, in which 150.000 people voted for their top 100 manga series, Bleach ranked 23rd.

See also
Burn the Witch, another manga series created by Kubo and set in the Bleach universe

Notes

References

External links

  
  
 

Bleach
2001 manga
Adventure anime and manga
Exorcism in anime and manga
Fiction about the afterlife
Ghost comics
Manga adapted into films
Manga adapted into television series
Mythopoeia
Paranormal fiction
Shinigami in anime and manga
Shueisha franchises
Shueisha manga
Shōnen manga
Supernatural anime and manga
Viz Media manga
Viz Media novels
Winners of the Shogakukan Manga Award for shōnen manga